The Financial Guard was the control agency, subordinated to the National Agency for Fiscal Administration (ANAF), having a mandate to control the financial, economic and customs domains to prevent and sanction  the tax evasion and tax-related fraud according to the legislation in effect. The institution was headed by a civil servant, having the mandate of the Chief Commissioner, being appointed by the Minister of Public Finance.

The Financial Guard could identify acts and deeds that had the effect of evasion and tax fraud, identifying  their fiscal implications and having, under the Tax Code Procedure, taking the precautionary measures - imposing the seizure - whenever there is a danger that the debtor will evade from prosecution, hide or waste the property. Also, the Financial Guards Commissioners may carry out, in the course of the operative and unannounced check, the monitoring and verification necessary to prevent, detect and combat tax evasion.

Since January 2010, the Financial Guard has acquired new powers, principally to conclude control acts to establish the tax situation and to establish the circumstances in the commission of criminal-law acts in the financial-fiscal field.

The Financial Guard has the following structure:
 The General Commissariat;
 County Sections and the Bucharest City Hall.

At the end of 2009, the Financial Guard reported a contribution of over 2,240 million lei (over 530 million euro) to the state budget, the recovery of the funds reported by the economic agents regarding the unpaid obligations at the legal deadlines.

History
By GEO no. 74/2013, the Financial Guard was abolished and the "General Anti-Fraud Directorate" (DGAF) was established.

See also
 Financial Guard (disambiguation)

References

Financial crime prevention
National law enforcement agencies of Romania
Customs services